Aljaž Bedene was the defending champion but chose not to defend his title.

Marco Trungelliti won the title after defeating Simone Bolelli 2–6, 7–6(7–4), 6–4 in the final.

Seeds

Draw

Finals

Top half

Bottom half

References
Main Draw
Qualifying Draw

Open Città della Disfida - Singles
2018 Singles